Tamás Székely (born 29 April 1923) was a Hungarian alpine skier. He competed in three events at the 1948 Winter Olympics.

References

External links
  

1923 births
Place of birth missing
Hungarian male alpine skiers
Olympic alpine skiers of Hungary
Alpine skiers at the 1948 Winter Olympics
Year of death missing
20th-century Hungarian people